David M. Berry is a Professor of Digital Humanities at the University of Sussex, writer and musician. He is widely published on academic work related to the fields of critical theory, digital humanities, media theory and algorithms.

Biography
Berry's early work focused on the philosophy of technology and particularly understanding open source and free software. More recently his work has explored the area of critical digital humanities, the notion of explainability, and the historical idea of a university.

In 1994, Berry co-founded, with Gibby Zobel, the radical newspaper SchNEWS whilst living in Brighton and he was involved in the protests against the Criminal Justice and Public Order Act 1994. Berry later went to work for Reuters Ltd working in London, and whilst in London also founded a record label, Loca Records in Old Street with Marcus McCallion in 1999. Loca Records was notable for releasing music experimentally in open access formats, such as the Gnu GPL and Creative Commons licenses.  Whilst running the record label he released electronica music under the names Meme (Loca Records) and Ward (Static Caravan Recordings). On 19 April 2000, John Peel played Meme's track Mandibles on BBC Radio 1 and later played Ward's track Sesquipedalian Origins on 5 February 2002 on the John Peel Show on BBC Radio 1. On 7 March 2002, John Peel again played the track Sesquipedalian Origins again, this time confused over the rpm he played it twice, notably the second time incorrectly at 45 rpm.

In 2000, Berry returned to Brighton to study a Masters in Social and Political Thought and in 2002 a PhD at the University of Sussex (funded by the ESRC). In 2007 he began work at Swansea University as a lecturer, moving in 2013 as a Reader (and then Professor) at the University of Sussex. In 2015 he co-founded the Sussex Humanities Lab at the University of Sussex, exploring the relation between digital cultures, literatures, materialities and philosophy.

Berry's first book published in 2008, Copy, Rip, Burn: The Politics of Copyleft and Open Source, undertook an examination of the way in which the proponents of the free software and open source communities understood their respective projects and how they articulated them in terms of an often implicit political ideology. The aim was to situate their ideas and practices within a broader movement of economic change brought on by the digitalisation of the economy and the shift to a so-called information society. Part of this change involves a movement in the way in which society conceptualises many of the background assumptions in terms of new notions, such as computational metaphors, stories and claims of an "open" or "free" norm that governs particular spheres of activity, such as "open science".

The book, The Philosophy of Software: Code and Mediation in a Digital Age, is Berry's second book, and is widely seen as both an important contribution to thinking about software, code and algorithms from a philosophical standpoint but also the outlines of a useful research programme. From questions about the "whatness" of software and code, to issues raised by reading and writing code, to a general programme of a phenomenology of software, the book concludes with a discussion of the becoming-stream of contemporary life due to software and the "real-time" of streams. Considering the book was written in 2011 it is remarkably prescient about the direction that technology has taken with the wide adoption of "streams" as a major form of interface in social media and other software products.

In Critical Theory and the Digital, published in 2014, the author looks to the Frankfurt School to develop a critical framework for thinking about software and algorithms. In this book he raises the particular issue of a form of software or computational metaphysics becoming prevalent as a new ideology which serves to mystify and obscure computation and its origins. Whilst an important contribution, this book tends to concentrate on the first generation critical theorists and the promised second book that takes account the second and third generation critical theorists is not yet published. Nonetheless, Berry proposes a new critical reading of the digital informed by an understanding of alienation and exploitation that is generated by computational technologies by drawing from this first generation critical theory scholarship and sets important foundations for future work.

In Digital Humanities: Knowledge and Critique in a Digital Age, together with the Norwegian academic Anders Fagerjord, they examine the history and theory in the area known as Digital Humanities. The book serves as an important contribution by bringing together the debates that have been happening within digital humanities, but also widen and deepen the discussions by proposing a theoretical critical digital humanities that complements the often highly technical nature of digital humanities work. This book is part of a current phase of consolidation within the discipline of digital humanities which is concerned both with improving the self-understanding of scholars working in this area but also directing a sense of a research programme more generally in digital humanities.

In 2019 he released new music under the name ØxØ on Truant Recordings with fellow musician Barnaby Thorn in the genre of Conceptronica.

More recently Berry is a member of the Internation Collectiv led by the late Bernard Stiegler which addressed the challenges of 21st century climate change and sustainability in relation to imagining a new political economy in a post-computational world. The collective published its first book called Bifurquer: Il n'y a pas d'alternative in 2020. The English translation of this book called Bifurcation: There is no Alternative, was published by Open Humanities Press in 2021. His recent discussions of explainability have built on this previous work, particularly in relation to artificial intelligence, machine-learning and meaning together with theories of explanation.

Prof. Berry is part of a research group, including Jeff Shrager who wrote the first BASIC version of ELIZA, that has uncovered the original source code for the chatbot ELIZA that was developed by Joseph Weizenbaum in the 1960s. The original source code was thought to have been long lost but was discovered in the MIT archives and has been made available for public release by Weizenbaum's family. The ELIZA source code has deep historical interest for historians and computer scientists and has been very influential on subsequent chatbot development. In addition the source code for Weizenbaum's SLIP software, which he wrote to add list-processing to the MAD system, has also been discovered and made available. 

He has held visiting fellowships at Kings College, London,  Forschungskolleg Humanwissenschaften (Institute for Advanced Studies) at Goethe University Frankfurt am Main, The School of Advanced Study, London, Lincoln College and Mansfield College at the University of Oxford, Wolfson College and CRASSH at the University of Cambridge, the Parliamentary Office of Science and Technology at the Houses of Parliament, and the University of Oslo.

Notable works
 As author
 Berry, D. M. and Fagerjord (2017) Digital Humanities: Knowledge and Critique in a Digital Age, London: Polity. ISBN 978-0745697666, pp. 248. [Translated  into Japanese and Chinese]
 Berry, D. M. (2014) Critical Theory and the Digital. New York: Bloomsbury Academic. ISBN 978-1441166395. Pp. 279.
 Berry, D. M. (2011) The Philosophy of Software: Code and Mediation in the Digital Age. London: Palgrave Macmillan, pp 216. ISBN 978-0230244184, Pp. 216.
 Berry, D. M. (2008) Copy, Rip, Burn: The Politics of Copyleft and Open Source. London: Pluto Press, pp 270. ISBN 978-0745324142, pp. 270.

 As editor
 Berry, D. M. and Dieter, M. (eds.) (2015) Postdigital Aesthetics: Art, Computation and Design, Palgrave Macmillan. ISBN 978-1137437198, Pp. 300.
 Berry, D. M. (ed.) (2012) Life in Code and Software, Open Humanities Press. ISBN 978-1607852834.
 Berry, D. M. (ed.) (2012) Understanding Digital Humanities. London: Palgrave Macmillan, pp. 318, ISBN 978-0230292659.

Discography

Albums

EPs

Singles

References 

 

Academics of the University of Sussex
Living people
Philosophers of technology
Philosophy academics
Philosophy writers
21st-century British philosophers
Continental philosophers
Critical theorists
Social philosophers
Alumni of the University of Sussex
1974 births